Rafael Durán Espayaldo (15 December 1911, Madrid – 12 February 1994, Sevilla) was a Spanish actor.

Biography 

After leaving his studies of civil engineer, he started on show business, first as dancer, later on theatre. His film debut is in  1935 in Rosario la cortijera, although he became popular with the comedy La tonta del bote, in 1939, costarred with Josita Hernán. The success of this film make Durán- Hernán as a film couple in another six films.

With Alfredo Mayo, he was the star of the Cinema of Spain in the 1940s. He appears in classics as Eloísa está debajo de un almendro  (1943); El clavo (1944), both directed by Rafel Gil and both co-starred by  Amparo Rivelles; Tuvo la culpa Adán (1944) and Él, ella y sus millones (1944), both by Juan de Orduña; El destino se disculpa (1945), directed by José Luis Sáenz de Heredia or La vida en un hilo (1945), by Edgar Neville, with Conchita Montes.

In the '50s start the decline of his popularity. He retires from screen in  1965. He acted in Jeromín (1953), Un ángel tuvo la culpa (1959) or El Valle de las espadas (1962).
Her daughter María Durán, member of the musical trio Acuario, was on the show business for a while.

In 1946 he won  Círculo de Escritores Cinematográficos Award as Best Actor for La pródiga.

Selected filmography
 The Complete Idiot (1939)
 Eloisa Is Under an Almond Tree (1943)
 The Nail (1944)
The Prodigal Woman (1946)
 The Faith (1947)
 The Captain from Loyola (1949)
 Saturday Night (1950)
 The Great Galeoto (1951)
 A Passenger Disappeared (1953)
 Jeromin (1953)
 We're All Necessary (1956)
 Fountain of Trevi (1960)
 A Girl from Chicago (1960)
 The Football Lottery (1960)
 Currito of the Cross (1965)
 Pedrito de Andía's New Life (1965)

External links 

1911 births
1994 deaths
Male actors from Madrid
Spanish male film actors
20th-century Spanish male actors